Autumn Crocus is a 1931 play by the British writer Dodie Smith. It was Smith's first play written under the pseudonym of C.L. Anthony. It follows a single schoolteacher who goes on holiday to the Tyrol and falls in love with the married owner of the hotel in which she is staying.

Directed by Basil Dean, it opened at the Lyric Theatre, London, on 6 April 1931, starring Fay Compton, Francis Lederer and Martita Hunt. Stage designs were by Gladys Calthrop. Such was its success that the management decided to put an additional 35 seats into the stalls.

Adaptation

In 1934, it was adapted into a film by Basil Dean's Associated Talking Pictures, which he also directed by Basil Dean. This version stars Fay Compton and Ivor Novello.

References

Bibliography
 Chambers, Colin. Continuum Companion to Twentieth Century Theatre. Continuun, 2002.
 Sweet, Matthew. Shepperton Babylon: The Lost Worlds of British Cinema. Faber and Faber, 2005.
 Robert Tanitch London Stage in the 20th Century Haus Publishing 2007

External links
1953 Best Plays radio adaptation at Internet Archive

1931 plays
Plays by Dodie Smith
West End plays
British plays adapted into films